Yusuf Göktuğ Ergin (born September 12, 1984) is an athlete from Turkey, who competes in archery.

2008 Summer Olympics
At the 2008 Summer Olympics in Beijing, Ergin finished his ranking round with a total of 660 points, which gave him the 23rd seed for the final competition bracket in which he faced Nuno Pombo in the first round, in which he beat the archer from Portugal 106–103. In the second round, Ergin was not able to win against 10th seed Lee Chang-hwan who shot a new Olympic Record of 117 points. Ergin still managed to hit 109 points, but was eliminated.

References

1984 births
Living people
Turkish male archers
Archers at the 2008 Summer Olympics
Olympic archers of Turkey
21st-century Turkish people